Inappropriateness refers to standards or ethics that are typically viewed as being negative in a society. It differs from things that are illicit in that inappropriate behavior does not necessarily have any accompanying legal ramifications.

Compendium

Synonyms of inappropriate include improper, unfitting, unsuitable. and indecent. Although social ills are usually outlawed in wider society, there are many examples wherein various jurisdictions give their inhabitants full discretion over certain aspects of their lives so they can police themselves without any intrusiveness. For instance, though it's legal to flatulate in a crowded elevator, there are strong social pressures not to do so. Other socially contentious behavior, such as smoking while pregnant, may procure a statement from a public health organization rather than from a law enforcement organization. The term has also been used to negatively refer to the usage of recreational drugs. Increasingly, the term is used in the context of sexual misconduct, especially touching of erogenous zones such as the genitalia or sending photos of said private parts.

Regulation
In the United States, the Supreme Court has ruled in FCC v. Pacifica Foundation (1978) that the Federal Communications Commission has the power to punish constitutionally protected but "indecent" expression on radio and broadcast television. The FCC released guidelines on indecency in 2001. The radio and television broadcast of indecent material is prohibited between 6 a.m. and 10 p.m.

See also
Indecent exposure
Immorality

References

Concepts in ethics